The 2010 ARAG World Team Cup was a tennis tournament played on outdoor clay courts. It was the 32nd edition of the World Team Cup, and was part of the 250 series of the 2010 ATP World Tour. It took place at the Rochusclub in Düsseldorf, Germany, from 16 May through 22 May 2010.

Serbia were the defending champions, but they were eliminated in the round robin stage.
Argentina defeated the United States in the final, to win the title for the fourth time.

Players

Blue Group

Juan Mónaco (# 27)
Eduardo Schwank (# 47)
Diego Veronelli (without place)
Horacio Zeballos (# 52)

 Jérémy Chardy (# 44)
 Nicolas Mahut (# 157)
 Paul-Henri Mathieu (# 56)

Andreas Beck (# 81)
Christopher Kas (# 33 Doubles)
Philipp Kohlschreiber (# 29)
Florian Mayer (# 48)

Filip Krajinović (# 209)
Dušan Lajović (# 505)
Viktor Troicki (# 40)
Nenad Zimonjić (# 3 Doubles)

Red Group

Carsten Ball (#119)
Paul Hanley (# 15 Doubles)
Lleyton Hewitt (# 31)
Peter Luczak (# 71)

Tomáš Berdych (# 16)
Lukáš Dlouhý (# 5 Doubles)
Jan Hájek (# 86)

Nicolás Almagro (# 18)
Daniel Gimeno-Traver (# 96)
Marc López (# 25 Doubles)

Bob Bryan (# 2 Doubles)
Mike Bryan (# 2  Doubles)
Robby Ginepri (# 98)
John Isner (# 19)
Sam Querrey (# 22)

Round robin

Blue Group

Standings

Germany vs France

Argentina vs Serbia

Argentina vs Germany

France vs Serbia

Germany vs. Serbia

France vs Argentina

Red Group

Standings

Australia vs USA

Czech Republic vs Spain

USA vs Spain

Czech Republic vs Australia

USA vs Czech Republic

Australia vs Spain

Final

Argentina vs USA

See also
Davis Cup
Hopman Cup

References
World Team Cup official website
Team Squads
Main Draw

ARAG ATP World Team Championship
ARAG World Team Cup
World Team Cup